Marlon Jones (born July 1, 1964) is a former NFL defensive tackle who played for the Cleveland Browns from 1987 to 1989. He went to Milford Mill Academy.

References

External links
Marlon Jones Stats

1964 births
Living people
Players of American football from Baltimore
American football defensive tackles
Canadian football defensive linemen
Central State Marauders football players
Cleveland Browns players
Toronto Argonauts players